The Journal of the American Medical Association (JAMA) is a peer-reviewed medical journal published 48 times a year by the American Medical Association. It publishes original research, reviews, and editorials covering all aspects of biomedicine. The journal was established in 1883 with Nathan Smith Davis as the founding editor. Kirsten Bibbins-Domingo of the University of California San Francisco became the journal editor-in-chief on July 1, 2022, succeeding Howard Bauchner of Boston University.

History 
The journal was established in 1883 by the American Medical Association and superseded the Transactions of the American Medical Association. Councilor's Bulletin was renamed the Bulletin of the American Medical Association, which later was absorbed by the Journal of the American Medical Association. In 1960, the journal obtained its current title, JAMA: The Journal of the American Medical Association. The journal is commonly referred to as JAMA.

Continuing medical education 
Continuing Education Opportunities for Physicians was a semiannual journal section providing lists for regional or national levels of continuing medical education (CME). Between 1937 and 1955, the list was produced either quarterly or semiannually. Between 1955 and 1981, the list was available annually, as the number of CME offerings increased from 1,000 (1955) to 8,500 (1981). In 2016, CME transitioned into a digital offering from the JAMA Network called JN Learning CME & MOC from JAMA Network. JN Learning provides CME and MOC credit from article and audio materials published within all 12 JAMA Network journals, including JAMA.

Publication of article by Barack Obama
On 11 July 2016, JAMA published an article by Barack Obama entitled "United States Health Care Reform: Progress to Date and Next Steps", which was the first academic paper ever published by a sitting U.S. president. The article was not subject to blind peer-review. It argued for specific policies that future presidents could pursue in order to improve national health care reform implementation.

Policy shift 
After the controversial 1999 firing of an editor-in-chief, George D. Lundberg, a process was put in place to ensure editorial freedom. A seven-member journal oversight committee was created to evaluate the editor-in-chief and to help ensure editorial independence. Since its inception, the committee has met at least once a year. Presently, JAMA policy states that article content should be attributed to authors, not to the publisher.

Artwork
From 1964 to 2013, JAMA used images of artwork on its cover and it published essays commenting on the artwork. According to former editor George Lundberg, this practice was designed to link the humanities and medicine. In 2013, a format redesign moved the art feature to an inside page, replacing an image of the artwork on the cover with a table of contents. The purpose of the redesign was to standardize the appearance of all journals in the JAMA Network.

Racism controversy 
In a February 2021 podcast, a JAMA deputy editor proposed that "structural racism is an unfortunate term to describe a very real problem" and that "taking racism out of the conversation would help" to ensure "all people who lived in disadvantaged circumstances have equal opportunities to become successful and have better qualities of life". The comments were immediately criticized by some, resulting in the deletion of the podcast. Editor-in-chief Bauchner issued a statement saying "Comments made in the podcast were inaccurate, offensive, hurtful, and inconsistent with the standards of JAMA", and the deputy editor resigned. Bauchner also subsequently resigned under pressure from the AMA and its Center for Health Equity Public commenters noted that the resignation of the 2 editors was an unfortunate substitute for meaningful conversations about racism and health care. In an October 2022 podcast, Barack Obama made arguments identical to those in the journal podcast, saying "We have to be able to speak to everybody about their common interests and what works for, I think, everybody, is the idea of basic equal treatment and fairness. That’s an argument that’s compatible with progress on social issues, and is compatible with economic issues. I think where we get into trouble sometimes is when we try to suggest that some groups are more— because they historically have been victimized more, that somehow they have a status that’s different than other people, and that we’re going around scolding folks if they don’t use exactly the right phrase. Or you know, that identity politics becomes the principle lens through which we view our various political challenges.

Previous chief editors 
The following persons have been editor-in-chief of JAMA:

Abstracting and indexing
The JAMA journal is abstracted and indexed in:

According to Journal Citation Reports, the journal has a 2021 impact factor of 157.335, ranking it 3rd out of 172 journals in the category "Medicine, General & Internal".

See also 
 List of American Medical Association journals

References

External links 
 
 American Medical Association Archives
 Free copies of volumes 1–80 (1883–1923), from the Internet Archive and HathiTrust

1883 establishments in the United States
American Medical Association academic journals
English-language journals
General medical journals
Publications established in 1883
Weekly journals